The Society for Social Studies of Science (4S) is a non-profit scholarly association devoted to the social studies of science and technology (STS). It was founded in 1975 and as of 2008 its international membership exceeds 1,200. In 2016, over 2,000 people attended the society's annual meeting in Barcelona, co-hosted by the European Association for the Study of Science and Technology (EASST). Its 40th anniversary celebration at Cornell University was attended by notable STS scholars such as Trevor Pinch, Sheila Jasanoff, and Bruno Latour.

Its charter was drafted in 1975, and its first President was the American sociologist Robert K. Merton. It is currently based out of the Department of Sociology at Louisiana State University. It publishes the quarterly academic journal Science, Technology, & Human Values and has a large annual conference attended by hundreds of scholars from a diverse range of fields, including Science and technology studies, sociology of science, science studies, history of science, philosophy of science, anthropology of science, economics, political science, psychology, as well as science educators and scientists.

It gives out the Ludwik Fleck Prize annually for "best book in the area of science and technology studies", the Rachel Carson Prize for "a work of social or political relevance", the John Desmond Bernal Prize for an individual who made "a distinguished contribution to the field", and the Nicholas C. Mullins Award for "outstanding scholarship in science and technology studies" by a graduate student.

As of 2020, the President of the society is Joan Fujimura, Professor of Sociology, University of Wisconsin - Madison. 4S is governed by a nine-person council as well as its president.

References

External links 

History of science organizations
Organizations established in 1975
Learned societies of the United States
Science and technology studies associations
Members of the International Council for Science
Members of the International Science Council